The 1915 Campeonato Carioca, the tenth edition of that championship, kicked off on May 2, 1915 and ended on October 31, 1915. It was organized by LMSA (Liga Metropolitana de Sports Athleticos, or Metropolitan Athletic Sports League). Seven teams participated. Flamengo won the title for the 2nd time. Rio Cricket was relegated.

Participating teams

System 
The tournament would be disputed in a double round-robin format, with the team with the most points winning the title. The team with the fewest points would dispute a playoff against the champions of the second level.

Championship

Relegation playoffs 
The last-placed team, Rio Cricket would dispute a playoff against Andarahy, champions of the Second Level. Rio Cricket lost the playoff, and with many of its players, who were mostly English, leaving to fight on World War I, Rio Cricket left the league in 1917.

References 

Campeonato Carioca seasons
Carioca